Komodo is a village and island of Komodo District, West Manggarai Regency, in East Nusa Tenggara province of Indonesia.
The village encompasses the territory of Komodo Island and the small surrounding islands.

Population
The native population of Komodo, the Komodo people, has been extinct since the 1980s. The present population consists of Bugis people from South Sulawesi and Bima people from West Nusa Tenggara.

References

Geography of Indonesia
Populated places in East Nusa Tenggara